Rietumu Banka–Riga is a Latvian cycling team established in 2002 in order to develop Latvian cyclists to an international level. Its main sponsor is Rietumu Banka. During next year`s former professional riders Jaan Kirsipuu and Arvis Piziks  worked as sports directors. It was a UCI Continental team until the end of the 2008 season, when team shifted main focus on XC MTB racing. In 2012 the team is once again registered at UCI level. The most famous riders of the team have been Aleksejs Saramotins, 2015 world time trial champion Vasil Kiryienka, and 2015 UCI America Tour winner Toms Skujiņš.

The team disbanded at the end of the 2017 season.

Major wins

2005
Stages 1a & 2 The Paths of King Nikola, Normunds Lasis
Prologue (ITT) Tour of Greece, Normunds Lasis
Stage 3 Tour of Greece, Gusts Eisaks
 Road Race Championships, Aleksejs Saramotins
Overall Giro della Toscana, Sergey Firsanov
2006
Mayor Cup, Normunds Lasis
 Road Race Championships, Aleksejs Saramotins
 Time Trial Championships, Vasil Kiryienka
Stage 6 Course de la Solidarité Olympique, Vasil Kiryienka
Stage 5a Tour of Bulgaria, Sergey Firsanov
2007
Stage 1 Triptyque des Monts et Châteaux, Normunds Lasis
Memorial Oleg Dyachenko, Sergey Firsanov
 Road Race Championships, Aleksejs Saramotins
Puchar Ministra Obrony Narodowej, Tarmo Raudsepp
Stage 4 Tour of Croatia, Aleksejs Saramotins
2008
Stage 1 Circuit des Ardennes, Aleksejs Saramotins
Stage 4 Rhône-Alpes Isère Tour, Alexander Mironov
Stage 1a Five Rings of Moscow, Mart Ojavee
Tallinn–Tartu GP, Mart Ojavee
Tartu GP, Aleksejs Saramotins
Stage 2 Ringerike GP, Sergey Firsanov
Scandinavian Open Road Race, Aleksejs Saramotins
Stage 3 Okolo Slovenska, Aleksejs Saramotins
Stage 4a Okolo Slovenska, Sergey Firsanov
Lombardia Tour, Aleksejs Saramotins
Overall Way to Pekin, Sergey Firsanov
Stage 1, Alexander Mironov
Stages 2, 3 & 7, Sergey Firsanov
Stage 4, Mart Ojavee
Stage 5, Justas Volungevičius
2011
Scandinavian Race Uppsala, Andžs Flaksis
2012
GP Oued Eddahab, Andris Smirnovs
2013
Stage 2 Tour de Blida, Toms Skujiņš
 Under-23 Road Race Championships, Toms Skujiņš
Prologue Tour de Guadeloupe, Team time trial
Stage 6 Baltic Chain Tour, Andris Smirnovs
2014
 Under-23 Road Race Championships, Krists Neilands
 Road Race Championships, Andris Vosekalns
2015
 Under-23 Time Trial Championships, Krists Neilands
Stage 1 Tour of China I, Armands Bēcis
Overall Tour de Borneo, Peeter Pruus
Stage 3, Krists Neilands
Stage 5, Peeter Pruus
2016
Overall Baltic Chain Tour, Maris Bogdanovics
Stage 2, Maris Bogdanovics
2017
 Under-23 Time Trial Championships, Marcis Kalnins

Team roster

References

External links
Official MTB Team Rietumu Website
Team Rietumu UCI Road Team Website
Team profile at UCI

Cycling teams based in Latvia
Cycling teams established in 2004
2004 establishments in Latvia